Foster County is a county in the U.S. state of North Dakota. As of the 2020 census, the population was 3,397. Its county seat is Carrington.

History
The Dakota Territory legislature created the county on January 4, 1873, with lands partitioned from Pembina County. It was named for George I. Foster, a pioneer and member of the Territorial legislature. Its governing structure was not completed at that time, and it was not attached to another county for administrative purposes. Its boundaries were altered in 1881, two times in 1883, and finally in 1885 its boundary was set at the present configuration. Its county organization was effected on October 11, 1883.

Geography
The James River flows south-southeastward through the central part of Foster County. The county terrain consists of low rolling hills, mostly devoted to agriculture, its eastern portion dotted with lakes and ponds. The terrain slopes to the south and east; its highest point is at its southwestern corner, at 1,942' (592m) ASL. It is the second-smallest county in North Dakota by area.

Major highways

  U.S. Highway 52
  U.S. Highway 281
  North Dakota Highway 9
  North Dakota Highway 20
  North Dakota Highway 200

Adjacent counties

 Eddy County - north
 Griggs County - east
 Stutsman County - south
 Wells County - west

National protected area
 Arrowwood National Wildlife Refuge (part)

Lakes

 Blue Cloud Lake
 Jack Lake
 Juanita Lake
 Lake Bonita
 Lake George
 Russell Lake

Demographics

2000 census
As of the 2000 census, there were 3,759 people, 1,540 households, and 1,031 families in the county. The population density was 2/km2 (6/sq mi). There were 1,793 housing units at an average density of 1/km2 (3/sq mi). The racial makeup of the county was 99.02% White, 0.13% Black or African American, 0.43% Native American, 0.05% from other races, and 0.37% from two or more races. 0.19% of the population were Hispanic or Latino of any race. 43.1% were of German, 31.0% Norwegian and 5.4% Irish ancestry.

There were 1,540 households, out of which 31.00% had children under the age of 18 living with them, 57.50% were married couples living together, 6.40% had a female householder with no husband present, and 33.00% were non-families. 30.60% of all households were made up of individuals, and 16.00% had someone living alone who was 65 years of age or older. The average household size was 2.39 and the average family size was 2.99.

The county population contained 26.20% under the age of 18, 5.50% from 18 to 24, 25.90% from 25 to 44, 21.00% from 45 to 64, and 21.40% who were 65 years of age or older. The median age was 40 years. For every 100 females there were 98.80 males. For every 100 females age 18 and over, there were 95.80 males.

The median income for a household in the county was $32,019, and the median income for a family was $40,469. Males had a median income of $31,442 versus $19,750 for females. The per capita income for the county was $17,928.  About 7.60% of families and 9.30% of the population were below the poverty line, including 10.90% of those under age 18 and 12.40% of those age 65 or over.

2010 census
As of the 2010 census, there were 3,343 people, 1,495 households, and 930 families in the county. The racial makeup of the county was 98.4% white, 0.6% American Indian, 0.1% black or African American, 0.1% Asian, 0.2% from other races, and 0.5% from two or more races. Those of Hispanic or Latino origin made up 0.9% of the population. In terms of ancestry, 54.2% were German, 35.9% were Norwegian, 9.8% were Irish, 5.8% were American, and 5.1% were Swedish.

Of the 1,495 households, 23.7% had children under the age of 18 living with them, 53.4% were married couples living together, 5.5% had a female householder with no husband present, 37.8% were non-families, and 33.5% of all households were made up of individuals. The average household size was 2.20 and the average family size was 2.81. The median age was 46.7 years.

The median income for a household in the county was $41,066 and the median income for a family was $55,278. Males had a median income of $40,076 versus $29,189 for females. The per capita income for the county was $27,945. About 3.4% of families and 7.3% of the population were below the poverty line, including 5.2% of those under age 18 and 13.4% of those age 65 or over.

Communities

Cities

 Carrington (county seat)
 Glenfield
 Grace City
 McHenry

Unincorporated communities

 Barlow
 Bordulac
 Guptill
 Juanita
 Melville

Government
The county is divided into 18 townships for certain aspects of governance.

Townships

 Birtsell
 Bordulac township
 Bucephalia
 Carrington
 Eastman
 Estabrook
 Florance
 Glenfield
 Haven
 Larrabee
 Longview
 McHenry
 McKinnon
 Melville
 Nordmore
 Rolling Prairie
 Rose Hill
 Wyard

Politics
Foster County voters have traditionally voted Republican. In only two national elections since 1948 has the county selected the Democratic Party candidate (as of 2020).

See also
 National Register of Historic Places listings in Foster County, North Dakota

References

External links

 ND DOT county map of Foster County (PDF)
 Foster County official website

 
1883 establishments in Dakota Territory
Populated places established in 1883